St Mary's Church is in Ambleside, Cumbria, England. It was built in the 1850s to a design by George Gilbert Scott in Gothic Revival style (specifically Decorated Gothic).
The building is Grade II* listed. Notable features include its stone spire, which is a local landmark and an unusual feature in Lake District churches.

The building is constructed of slate, the typical building stone of the locality, and sandstone which is used for dressings and the spire.

History
The decision to build the church reflects the coming of the railway to Windermere in 1847 and the subsequent expansion of Ambleside because of the increased opportunities for tourism.

A north-east choir vestry was added in 1889 to the designs of Paley & Austin of Lancaster.

Interior

Wall-painting
There is a 26-foot mural on the west wall depicting the traditional ceremony of rushbearing (which still takes place on the first Saturday in July). The mural was created by Gordon Ransom of the Royal College of Art when the College was evacuated to Ambleside during the Second World War. The vicar of Ambleside,  Henry Adamson Thompson,  is depicted on the right hand side of the mural.

Bells 
The tower contains a heavy peal of eight bells cast by John Taylor & Co of Loughborough in 1901. With the tenor weighing 32 and a half long cwt (1,652 kg), they are the fourth heaviest ring of eight in the United Kingdom and the heaviest ring of eight outside of the West Country. The bells can be heard from across Lake Windermere and are considered to be amongst the finest rings of their kind in the UK.

Burials

Burials include Mary Louisa Armitt, the founder of Ambleside's Armitt Library.
Her sisters Annie and Sophia are also buried there.

References

External links

Church of England church buildings in Cumbria
Grade II* listed churches in Cumbria
George Gilbert Scott buildings
Austin and Paley buildings
Gothic Revival architecture in Cumbria
Diocese of Carlisle
19th-century Church of England church buildings
St Mary's Church